Adolfo Domínguez Gerardo (born 10 February 1991) is a Mexican professional footballer who plays as a midfielder.

Honours
Cafetaleros
Ascenso MX: Clausura 2018

References

1991 births
Living people
Mexican footballers
Association football midfielders
Club Tijuana footballers
Dorados de Sinaloa footballers
FC Juárez footballers
Cafetaleros de Chiapas footballers
Deportivo Toluca F.C. players
Liga MX players
Ascenso MX players
Tercera División de México players
People from Mexicali
Footballers from Baja California